Monika Milenova Razhgeva (born 21 November 1992) is a Bulgarian football defender currently playing in the Bulgarian Championship for NSA Sofia, with which she has also played the Champions League. In August 2010 she made her debut for the Bulgarian national team against Greece.

References

1992 births
Living people
Women's association football defenders
Bulgarian women's footballers
Bulgaria women's international footballers
FC NSA Sofia players